Pablo Alí was a chief military commander of Haitian origin, who was in charge of the so-called Battalion 31 or Batallon de Morenos (Dark-skinned Battalion), freed slaves which joined the ranks of the Dominican army. Alí directed the battalion to participate in the Italian rebellion of 1810, during the government of Sánchez Ramírez. He was said to have been "most prominent, achieving great military distinction in Santo Domingo".

References

External links
Pablo Alí at Wiki Dominica 

People of Saint-Domingue
People of the Colony of Santo Domingo
Dominican Republic military personnel
Dominican Republic people of Haitian descent